The 1916 St George, Hanover Square by-election was held on 11 January 1916.  The by-election was held due to the elevation of the incumbent Conservative MP, Sir Alexander Henderson. It was won by the Unionist candidate Sir George Reid, the former Prime Minister of Australia, who acted as a spokesman for the self-governing Dominions in supporting the war effort. He was unopposed.  There was a history of unopposed by-elections in the constituency and the War-time electoral pact meant that the other major parties would not endorse candidates in that election.

Sir George Reid was to die in 1918 triggering another unopposed by-election.

References 

St George's, Hanover Square by-election
St George's, Hanover Square by-election
St George's, Hanover Square by-election
St George's, Hanover Square,1916
1910s in the City of Westminster
St George's, Hanover Square,1916
Unopposed by-elections to the Parliament of the United Kingdom in English constituencies